Pellitory may refer to:

Anacyclus pyrethrum or pellitory, a plant containing an oil once used for toothaches and facial neuralgia
Achillea ptarmica or European pellitory, bastard pellitory, or wild pellitory
Parietaria debilis
Parietaria officinalis or eastern pellitory-of-the-wall
Parietaria judaica or spreading pellitory, or pellitory-of-the-wall
Dalmatian pellitory, a pyrethrum plant of the genus Chrysanthemum